The following is a list of towns or cities holding celebrations known as "Sauerkraut Days." All celebrations went on hiatus in 2020.

Ackley, Iowa has held an annual Sauerkraut Days celebration since 1902.
Blairstown, Iowa holds an annual Sauerkraut Days celebration. Its 46th official year was marked in 2019, but none the next year.
Henderson, Minnesota holds an annual Sauerkraut Days celebration at the end of June.
Lisbon, Iowa holds an annual Sauerkraut Days festival.
Wishek, North Dakota holds its annual Sauerkraut Day, inaugurated in 1922, on the second Wednesday in October. It held its 94th celebration in 2019, but none the next year. 
Providence, Utah has an annual Sauerkraut Days festival, depending on sauerkraut availability.
Frankfort, Illinois holds a "Frankfort Fall Festival" which was originally known as Sauerkraut Days.
Forreston, Illinois has held an annual "Sauerkraut Day" since 1913, except 1917–18, 1942–45 & 2020.

 
Sauerkraut Days
 S